Omar Berdouni (born 20 July 1979) is a Moroccan actor.

He has starred in a number of feature films including The Hamburg Cell, United 93, "The Situation", The Kingdom and Extraordinary Rendition, directed by Jim Threapleton. He also appeared in Body of Lies, starring Leonardo DiCaprio. In 2009, he played Ahmed in the BBC show Occupation, (Season 1, Episode 3). He also played in the 2005 French film Les Chevaliers du Ciel and the 2010 film Green Zone.

Filmography

References

External links
Omar Berdouni Official Fan Page
Interview with Omar Berdouni on NPR

Blog of Berdouni's upcoming film, Extraordinary Rendition
Body Of Lies Movie

1979 births
Living people
Moroccan male film actors
People from Tangier
Alumni of the American School of Tangier
English people of Moroccan descent
British male film actors
Alumni of the Webber Douglas Academy of Dramatic Art
20th-century Moroccan male actors
21st-century Moroccan male actors